Suvoloka is a rural locality (a village) in Posyolok Nikologory, Vyaznikovsky District, Vladimir Oblast, Russia. The population was 12 as of 2010.

Geography 
Suvoloka is located 28 km southwest of Vyazniki (the district's administrative centre) by road. Zhelnino is the nearest rural locality.

References 

Rural localities in Vyaznikovsky District